Charles Spring Rice, 5th Baron Monteagle of Brandon (28 January 1887 – 9 December 1946) was an Anglo-Irish peer.

Spring Rice was the son of Francis Spring Rice, 4th Baron Monteagle of Brandon, by his first wife, Elizabeth Ann FitzGerald. He was educated at Harrow School and Trinity College, Cambridge. Spring Rice served as an officer in the Royal Army Service Corps during the First World War, leaving the army as a captain in 1919. He inherited his barony following the death of his father in 1937, when he took his seat as a Conservative in the House of Lords. He lived at Mount Trenchard House.

He married Emilie Frances de Kosenko, an American heiress, on 14 April 1925 and they had three children. He was succeeded by his eldest son, Gerald.

References

1887 births
1946 deaths
Alumni of Trinity College, Cambridge
5
People educated at Harrow School
Charles
20th-century Anglo-Irish people
Charles
Royal Army Service Corps officers
Conservative Party (UK) hereditary peers
Younger sons of barons